Cold of Kalandar is a 2015 Turkish drama film directed by Mustafa Kara. It was selected as the Turkish entry for the Best Foreign Language Film at the 89th Academy Awards but it was not nominated.

Cast
 Haydar Sisman
 Nuray Yesilaraz
 Hanife Kara
 Ibrahim Kuvvet
 Temel Kara

Awards
At the 2016 Haifa International Film Festival, Cold of Kalandar received two awards: the "Golden Anchor" Award (Best Film in the Mediterranean Film Competition) and the Fedeora Award by the Federation of Film Critics of Europe and the Mediterranean for Best Foreign Film. It also won the award for Best Film at the 2016 Asia Pacific Screen Awards, and IFFI ICFT UNESCO Gandhi Medal at the 47th International Film Festival of India

See also
 List of submissions to the 89th Academy Awards for Best Foreign Language Film
 List of Turkish submissions for the Academy Award for Best Foreign Language Film

References

External links
 

2015 films
2015 drama films
Turkish drama films
2010s Turkish-language films